Thomas Calvin Cooney (July 18, 1853- January 8, 1907) was an American sailor serving in the United States Navy during the Spanish–American War who received the Medal of Honor for bravery.

Biography
Cooney was born July 18, 1853, in Westport, Nova Scotia, and after entering the navy he rose to the rank of Chief Carpenters Mate and fought in the Spanish–American War aboard the U.S. Torpedo Boat Winslow.

He died January 8, 1907, and is buried in United States Naval Academy Cemetery, Annapolis, Maryland. His grave can be found in lot 254.

Medal of Honor citation
Rank and organization: Chief Machinist, U.S. Navy. Born: 18 July 1853, Westport, Nova Scotia. Accredited to: New Jersey. G.O. No.: 497, 3 September 1898.

Citation:

On board the U.S. Torpedo Boat Winslow during the action at Cardenas, Cuba, 11 May 1898. Following the piercing of the boiler by an enemy shell, Cooney, by his gallantry and promptness in extinguishing the resulting flames, saved the boiler tubes from burning out.

See also

List of Medal of Honor recipients for the Spanish–American War

References

External links

1853 births
1907 deaths
United States Navy Medal of Honor recipients
United States Navy sailors
Canadian emigrants to the United States
American military personnel of the Spanish–American War
Canadian-born Medal of Honor recipients
Burials at the United States Naval Academy Cemetery
Spanish–American War recipients of the Medal of Honor